The album, Mensajera del Amór (A Messenger of Love) is the debut album by Mexican-American pop singer Myra, only then known as Mayra Caról. Before Myra was signed to Walt Disney Records and started appearing to the Pop Music market Myra was singing Mariachi music which is a native genre of folk music in Mexico. The track listing for Mensajera del Amór includes cover versions of famous Mariachi classics. One of them being Volver, Volver by Vicente Fernández. Mensajera del Amór was recorded in Los Angeles, CA and it was released in August 1997 under the label Briaz Promotions. The album was credited to Myra as Mayra Caról con Mariachi or (Mayra Caról with Mariachi) and she certainly performed the album at different venues and events.

Mensajes borrados track listing 
 Mensajera del Amór (A Messenger of Love)
 Michoacán
 La Vida Del Huerfanito (The Life of the Orphan)
 Volver, Volver (Return, Return)
 Barrio Humilde (Humble Neighborhood)
 Amór Eterno (Eternal Love)
 Consejos de Una Niña (Advice from a Girl)
 Amór de Los Dos (A Love for Two)
 Bella Infancia (Beautiful Childhood)
 Gracias (Thank You)

References

1997 debut albums
Myra (singer) albums
Spanish-language albums